Jessie is an American comedy television series created by Pamela Eells O'Connell that aired on Disney Channel from September 30, 2011 to October 16, 2015. The series stars Debby Ryan, Peyton List, Cameron Boyce, Karan Brar, Skai Jackson, and Kevin Chamberlin.

Plot 
The series follows Jessie Prescott, a young woman from a small town with big dreams who, rebelling against her strict father, decides to leave the military base in Texas where she grew up and moves to New York City. She accepts a job as a nanny and moves into a multimillion-dollar penthouse on the Upper West Side with the wealthy Ross family which includes jet-setting parents Morgan and Christina Ross and their four rambunctious children: Emma, Luke, Ravi, and Zuri, along with the family pet, Mr. Kipling, a seven-foot Asian water monitor lizard, that was later revealed to be a female. With a whole new world of experiences open to her, Jessie embarks on new adventures in the big city as she grows to rely on the love and support of the children in her care. Assisting her are Bertram, the family's lazy and sarcastic butler, and Tony, the building's 20-year-old doorman.

Characters

Main 
 
 (Debby Ryan) is an idealistic and resourceful girl from the military base of Fort Hood, Texas. As a recent high school graduate rebelling against her strict father who wanted her to join the army, Jessie moved to New York City to realize her dreams of stardom but, due to an unexpected turn of events, ends up becoming a nanny to the four Ross children. Even though at times both Jessie and the Ross kids annoy each other, they all deeply care for one another and Jessie is even shown to be sometimes overprotective. Later her last name is revealed to be Prescott. In the episode "Make New Friends, but Hide the Old", she reveals that she is an only child. Jessie also has a complicated love life. Her boyfriend stories are frequently mentioned, and only in "The Rosses Get Real" are they called something other than boring and pathetic. Her mother has never been seen but is mentioned in "G.I. Jessie".
 (Peyton List) is a diva, somewhat ditsy, cynical girl, eager to reorder the world to the way she sees it. Emma is the oldest child of the Ross family, and Morgan and Christina's only biological child. Emma spends most of her time with Zuri and doesn't appreciate her brother Luke. In the second season, she acts as Kitty Couture, an anonymous fashion vlogger, and starts to get along with Luke more. She and Ravi also spend time together as brother and sister. It is revealed in the episode titled Karate Kid-tastrophe that her full name is Emma Evangeline Ross.
 (Cameron Boyce) is a laid back, flirty, crafty boy who was born in Detroit and has a passion for video games, break-dancing, and causing mischief around the penthouse while also being sarcastic at times. He considers himself a "ladies' man", having taken a liking to Jessie in particular. Luke even tried to date her in the first few episodes. Luke is the second oldest of the Ross children. In "The Kid Whisperer", his full name is revealed to be Lucas. He spends a lot of time with his brother, Ravi, and has a close bond with Bertram as well. In "Lizard Scales and Wrestling Tales", his middle name is revealed as Philbert, named after his grandpa.
 (Karan Brar) is a gentle, intelligent and courteous boy, born and raised for ten and a half years in West Bengal, India, and the newest addition of the Ross family. He is imbued with the culture of his beloved homeland but is thrilled with his new life in the United States. He is the third oldest of the Ross children and also the most intelligent. He spends most of his time with Luke but appreciates his sisters all the same. He also spends time with his lizard Mr. Kipling—later revealed to be Mrs. Kipling—which he brought from India.
 (Skai Jackson) is a sassy, strong-willed, quick-witted and talkative girl who was brought to NYC from her birth country of Uganda. She is highly creative with a penchant for rainbows, unicorns, mermaids, and country music, and has many stuffed animals and imaginary friends. She is the youngest of the Ross children. She has close bonds with Jessie, Emma, and her imaginary friends. Zuri later lets go of all of her imaginary friends, hinting that she's maturing as an adolescent.
 (Kevin Chamberlin) is the Ross family's butler. He is grouchy and often very lazy, though begrudgingly helps Jessie navigate her job as nanny to the four Ross children. In "The Kid Whisperer", his hoarding obsession is revealed. In "Tempest in a Teacup", it is revealed that Bertram is claustrophobic. He also has a passion for opera music and boy bands. Even though the Ross kids, as well as Jessie, get on his nerves sometimes, he deeply cares about them. In "One-Day Wonders", it is revealed that his last name is Winkle.

Recurring 
Christina Ross (Christina Moore) is the mother of the four Ross children and a former supermodel turned business magnate.
Tony is the doorman in the building where the Ross family lives who has strong feelings for Jessie and helps her navigate her adventures in the big city. He also starts to date Jessie in "The Princess and the Pea Brain". They later break up in "Break-Up and Shape-Up". In "The Trouble with Tessie", it is revealed that his last name is Chiccolini. His parents own a restaurant in Little Italy. A recurring joke on the show has Jessie and Bertram asking the kids where they found some strange, but necessary, things, and the response is invariably "Tony knows a guy".
Morgan Ross (Charles Esten) is the father of the four Ross children and a famous movie director. The pilot episode reveals he is friends with George Lucas.
 (lizard named Frank), known as Mr. Kipling in the first season, is the Ross family's house pet, a seven-foot Asian water monitor lizard that Ravi brought from India when he came to the US. In the season one finale episode, "The Secret Life of Mr. Kipling", it is revealed that  is actually a female water monitor lizard and has laid twelve eggs.
Rhoda Chesterfield (Carolyn Hennesy) is the cold-hearted head of the city condominium board in the building where the Ross family lives. Her first spat with Jessie and the Ross clan involved Mrs. Kipling tearing her clothes up in the elevator. She dislikes anyone who is not rich, who is under 20, or who is less self-absorbed than herself. This sadly doesn't stop her from repeatedly hitting on Bertram, lavishing too much affection on her chihuahua, Zeus, or constantly calling Jessie by the wrong name. In "101 Lizards", it is revealed that she has a daughter, Cassandra, and owns a lizard sanctuary. It is also revealed in "Between the Swoon and New York City" that she has a son named Brooks. It is also revealed that she has been married more than once. She had no romantic feelings toward her first husband and married him for his money. Despite her rivalry against the Ross family, it is shown in "101 Lizards" that she seems to have a soft spot for Emma.
Stuart Wooten (J.J. Totah) is a quick-witted, yet love-struck, kid. He has a huge crush on Zuri and is a good friend to the Ross brothers. In "Quitting Cold Koala", he and Zuri go on a romantic picnic, implying that they have a relationship. Stuart is usually nice and kind, but he's able to show a blunt side when he wants to, like Zuri does, as seen in later episodes. In "Quitting Cold Koala", he attempts to make Zuri jealous and hint that she likes him back. In "Panic Attack Room", he addresses the Ross brothers as neanderthals, annoyed that they interrupted his board game date with Luke and Ravi's younger sister. He also seems to own a pair of pants for every single occasion, such as "picnic pants", " bravery pants", and "panic room pants". In "Acting with the Frenemy", he is jealous when Zuri has a crush on Shane, Luke's new friend, and they have a dance-off for Zuri. He stands up for her, creating romance between the two. In "Where's Zuri?", after undergoing transformation from Stuart to Stu-Dog by his new nanny, Zuri falls for him.
Officer Petey (Joey Richter) is a police officer who is strangely obsessed with the performing arts. He is not a very good police officer. In fact, he wanted to be an actor. In "Pain in the Rear Window", it is revealed that he has very little physical strength and cannot tolerate the sight of bruised skin, let alone blood. It is also revealed that he did not go to a police academy.
Rosie (Kelly Gould) is Emma's best friend who lives in a crime-ridden area of the city but is actually a nice girl. She used Emma to lampoon a nasty girl in "Make New Friends, but Hide the Old"; however, since Emma and Rosie both hate the bully, they become friends by the end of the episode. In "Trashin' Fashion", she is Emma's camera girl for their blog. Their friendship is threatened when Rosie stands up for Bryn in "Kids Don't Wanna Be Shunned".
Agatha (Jennifer Veal) is an unattractive, arrogant British nanny who frequently locks horns with Jessie and the Ross children. During their first meeting, she attempts to ban Zuri and Jessie from Central Park. Zuri and Jessie ignore Agatha and keep coming back, so Agatha starts posting mean things, saying that Jessie is a bad nanny on her website "Toddler Tattler". Zuri, Jessie, and Christina stand up to Agatha and Agatha shuts down her website. Agatha has a twin sister, Angela, revealed in "Evil Times Two", who is even more dishonest and tries to steal Jessie's job, but Jessie and the Ross kids stand up to her and she goes back to England.
Connie Thompson (Sierra McCormick) is an insane girl with an obsessive crush on Luke. In "Creepy Connie Comes a Callin'", she tutors Luke but also tries to flirt with him. In "Creepy Connie's Curtain Call", she auditions for the school play written by Jessie. She causes "accidents" to the female lead and understudies, so she can get the lead role and kiss Luke. In "Creepy Connie 3: The Creepening", she hires an actress named Mackenzie to pretend to be obsessed with Luke so he'll like Connie. It is also revealed that Connie is Boomer's niece and is mentioned to have so many restraining orders that there a few places in New York where she is "allowed to stand". In "Creepy Connie's Curtain Call", she starts dating Ravi but pretends to not remember him in "Creepy Connie 3: The Creepening". She is also an avid fan of Harry Potter.
 Boomer (Lombardo Boyar) is Emma's new boss and Connie's uncle. He is shown as a hardworking and easily persuaded man while also annoyed with Connie's antics.
 Brooks Wentworth (Pierson Fode) is Jessie's new boyfriend who later becomes Jessie's fiancé. He got a job in Africa and asked Jessie to get married as soon as possible. She decides to go with him but the kids become upset when they find out. On their wedding day, Jessie realizes she is not ready for marriage and breaks up with Brooks. Jessie stays in New York and Brooks leaves for Africa. They later meet up and Jessie is surprised to learn Brooks has moved on from her.

Guest stars 
 Bryn Breitbart (Katherine McNamara) appeared in "Kids Don't Wanna Be Shunned", where she attempts to steal Emma's friends by pretending she is of Danish royalty. In "Diary of a Mad Newswoman", Emma forgives Bryn and they become coworkers on Ravi's school news show. She tries to ruin Emma by feeding her a fake story, but Emma, Luke, and Ravi catch her in her act. Luke had a crush on her before her plot was revealed.
 Shaylee Michaels (Maia Mitchell) is a successful Australian actress who befriends Jessie, casting her as her stunt double in her latest film in "Jessie's Big Break". Her boyfriend McD (John DeLuca), who is also the director of the movie, attempts to flirt and kiss Jessie and later turn Shaylee against Jessie by claiming Jessie was lying to her. Jessie ultimately proves her innocence with Luke's camera footage proving that McD had indeed flirted with Jessie. Shaylee is the only girl in the series whom Luke has had a crush on big enough to rival his crush on Jessie. She later returns in "Jessie's Aloha-Holidays with Parker and Joey" where she and Jessie are up for a role in a Hawaiian TV show.
 Ms. Falkenberg (Cheri Oteri) is Zuri’s quirky but overly strict third-grade teacher, appearing in the episode "Teacher's Pest". Jessie serves as Ms. Falkenberg’s classroom aide.
 Chris Bosh appeared as himself in "Say Yes to the Messy Dress". He keeps his stinky white socks from the tenth grade as a sign of good luck, even though Luke disagrees with him and tries to sabotage his chance to win a basketball game against the New York Knicks.
 Adam Sandler appeared as himself in "Punch Dumped Love", making spare change. He claims he wants to go by his nickname "Thunder".
 Ted (Spencer Boldman) appeared in "Break-Up and Shake-Up" as one of Jessie's old boyfriends. According to Jessie, he was ugly when she dated and dumped him and is now a male model. Jessie attempts to use him to make Tony jealous. In the end, he goes out with Victoria (Lulu Antariksa), and Tony and Jessie break up.
 Vic (Lulu Antariksa) appears in "Break-Up and Shake-Up", where Tony trains her to become a doorwoman, causing Jessie to become jealous of them. In the end, Vic goes out with one of Jessie’s exes, Ted.
 Max Bauer (Matthew Timmons) is Jessie's young agent who appears in "Caught Purple Handed", where he says that he is living in his mother's basement and has to pay her rent. He gets Jessie her first infomercial job as a hand model, but he is fired with her after Jessie botches the job. Jessie later thanks Max for his faith in her and agrees to let him stay as her agent.
 Earl (Garrett Clayton) appeared in "The Blind Date, the Cheapskate, and the Primate", where he is the garbage man in the apartment building.
 Maybelle (Stefanie Scott) is the new girl in the Ross's apartment building. She appears in "Hoedown Showdown", where she hog-ties Emma's new "soul mate" after he asks her out knowing Emma likes him.
 Mackenzie (G. Hannelius) is another creepy girl in school along with Connie. She appears in "Creepy Connie 3: The Creepening" where she has a psycho crush on Luke just like Connie. She is very creepy by making a bracelet of baby teeth for Luke and also wanting Luke to date her just like Connie. However, Connie and Mack wrestle after they find out they both like Luke. Later, it is revealed that Mack was an actress hired by Connie and really did not have a crush on Luke.
 Mrs. Arthur (Jo Anne Worley) is Nana Banana in "Zuri's New Old Friend".
 Michelle Obama appeared as herself in "From the White House to Our House", where she is called by Zuri because Zuri wants her friend Taylor's mother to be home for Taylor's tenth birthday.
 Mr. Moseby (Phill Lewis) appeared in "Karate Kid-tastrophe", where it is revealed he became the New York Tipton's hotel manager after the events of The Suite Life on Deck. Jessie accidentally runs into him while Emma is holed up in a room. Mr. Moseby later gives Jessie advice on how to deal with teenagers like Emma. He later calls Cody to inform him about encountering a girl who looks like Bailey.
 Madeline (Francesca Capaldi) appeared in "What A Steal". She reveals herself to be a thief with her brother Scott.
 Chris Paul as himself appeared in "Basket Cases". He was coaching Ravi how to play basketball.
 The Vamps as Themselves appeared in "Dance, Dance, Resolution" as they performed at the school dance.
 Delphina (Meaghan Martin) appeared in "Rossed at Sea Part 1". Zuri believes she is a mermaid. Later, she is determined to have a memory loss in the water and is revealed to be a singer named Kim, not a mermaid.

Production

Development 
The series was created by Pamela Eells O'Connell, who had previous experience with the "nanny" sitcom formula, starting her career as a writer on the series Charles in Charge and serving as co-executive producer on The Nanny, before working with Debby Ryan on The Suite Life on Deck. O'Connell is said to have developed Jessie specifically to showcase Ryan's talent. In an interview with the Star-Telegram, Ryan explained how the concept originated: "(O'Connell) and I were throwing ideas back and forth when The Suite Life was coming to an end, and she came up with this. I was absolutely captivated. Then Disney looked at the script and the show runner (O'Connell) and myself and they were like: 'Awesome. We like it. You're on in the fall'". In interviews with Variety, Disney Channel President Gary Marsh spoke of working with Ryan again: "It's been thrilling to watch Debby grow from an unknown actress to one of our top stars. Debby is a talented young actress who connects to a wide fanbase because she's genuine, relatable and aspirational all at once. Our viewers have followed her from The Suite Life on Deck to 16 Wishes, and we're pleased to be working with her again." Jessie was the first main character to be engaged on the Disney Channel. There was a four-part episode about the engagement.

Casting 

With Ryan signed on, Disney Channel began the search to cast the Ross family in May 2011. Before casting was finalized, there were numerous differences in the original concept for several of the characters. The role of the mother to the Ross children was originally a photographer named "Pandora", the role of the oldest daughter, Emma, was originally named "Anabel", the role of Luke was originally a boy adopted from Korea named "Hiro", and the role of Ravi was originally a boy adopted from South America named "Javier" who had a pet capybara instead of a water monitor. Some have speculated that Brad Pitt and Angelina Jolie, as a prominent celebrity couple with a multi-cultural adoptive family, may have been one possible inspiration for the series. In an interview with the Boston Herald, O'Connell described her inspiration, saying: "I thought the celebrity parents and gorgeous penthouse would be glamorous, and a nice contrast to Jessie's more modest Texas roots. That fish out of water element makes for good stories, and I was inspired by many families who have adopted children of different ethnicities." The Ross parents are only shown in a few episodes throughout the series.

Filming 
After casting was finalized and changes were made to several of the characters to suit the actors chosen, the series skipped the pilot phase and was put directly into production. Filming began in June 2011 on Stage 3/8 at Hollywood Center Studios which, prior to start of production, served as the sound stage where the Disney Channel series Wizards of Waverly Place was taped. 13 episodes were originally ordered for the first season, but while the show's first season was in production, Disney Channel ordered an additional seven episodes, bringing the total number of episodes for the first season to 20. When asked about the atmosphere on set during an interview with MSN TV, Ryan described her relationship with the young cast: "I definitely feel like a nanny!  They are smart kids, but they're real kids. They like to have fun. My policy is: We can play hard, as long as we work hard, and because we work hard, we need to play hard." Filming on the series wrapped on February 22, 2015.

On March 28, 2013, the series was renewed for a third season, with production resuming in July 2013. Season 3 premiered on October 5, 2013. On April 16, 2014, it was announced that Jessie would get engaged in a four-episode arc that would conclude the season in the fall, marking the first time a Disney Channel lead character has gotten engaged.

The series was renewed for a fourth season on May 20, 2014. Production began in August 2014 for a January 9, 2015 premiere. On October 1, 2014, Peyton List stated that the fourth season would be the last season of Jessie. On January 9, 2015, Debby Ryan said that the fourth season will see the show go past its 100th episode and also see its fifth crossover with another Disney Channel show. She also stated that Jessie will end in early 2016.

On February 25, 2015, Disney Channel officially announced the series would end after its fourth season, bringing the series to a total of 101 episodes. On the same day, Disney ordered the first season of a spin-off titled BUNK'd, which stars Peyton List, Karan Brar, and Skai Jackson in their respective roles. 98 episodes were eventually aired in the series as 6 of the 101 produced episodes were combined into 3 extended length specials for broadcast and video sales.

Episodes

Crossovers

Austin & Jessie & Ally All Star New Year 
In November 2012, Disney Channel announced that the show would crossover with Austin & Ally as a one-hour special episode titled "Austin & Jessie & Ally All Star New Year". The episode aired December 7, 2012.

Good Luck Jessie: NYC Christmas 
In October 2013, Disney Channel announced a crossover episode of Jessie and Good Luck Charlie called "Good Luck Jessie: NYC Christmas". In the episode, PJ (Jason Dolley) and Teddy (Bridgit Mendler) go to New York for Christmas Eve and stay with Jessie for Christmas due to a snowstorm. The episode aired on November 29, 2013.

Ultimate Spider-Man: Web-Warriors 
The series crossed over with the Marvel/Disney XD series Ultimate Spider-Man: Web Warriors for a Halloween episode titled "Halloween Night at the Museum" on October 10, 2014.

Jessie's Aloha-Holidays with Parker and Joey 
On November 28, 2014, Jessie shared its fourth crossover with the series Liv and Maddie in a special episode titled "Jessie's Aloha-Holidays with Parker and Joey", featuring Joey Bragg as Joey Rooney and Tenzing Norgay Trainor as Parker Rooney. This crossover put Jessie into a tie with Hannah Montana and Lilo & Stitch: The Series as the Disney Channel shows to have had the most crossovers. This was counted as a single one-hour episode of Jessie with Liv and Maddie characters, and was not a Liv and Maddie episode.

Controversy 
Disney Channel did not broadcast "Quitting Cold Koala" on its originally scheduled date of May 17, 2013, and showed a rerun of "Kids Don't Wanna Be Shunned" instead. The episode did, however, appear on the Disney Channel website, "WATCH Disney Channel", and on "Disney Channel on Demand", the channel's video-on-demand service. On Facebook, Disney Channel announced, "We are removing this particular episode from our regular programming schedule and will re-evaluate its references to gluten restrictions in the character's diet". The edited version of "Quitting Cold Koala" aired on July 5, 2013, as part of a two-episode spectacular, with all gluten jokes having been removed in the revised version.

Spin-off and foreign adaptation 
On February 25, 2015, Disney Channel announced that a Jessie spin-off titled Bunk'd would begin production in the spring. The series would star Peyton List, Karan Brar, and Skai Jackson. The show premiered on July 31, right after the Disney Channel Original Movie Descendants.

In India, a Hindi-language adaptation of the show, titled Oye Jassie, premiered on Disney Channel on October 13, 2013. Like most adaptations, the episodes and characters are similar to the original.

Release 
The pilot episode of Jessie was released as a free download via the iTunes Store one week prior to its Disney Channel premiere. Making its official debut on the Disney Channel on September 30, 2011, the series became the network's most-watched premiere on a Friday since September 2008, when The Suite Life on Deck debuted.  The premiere of Jessie ranked as the number-one telecast at 9:00 PM with a total of 4.6 million total viewers in the target demographics, scoring 2.3 million viewers among kids 6–11, 1.8 million viewers among tweens and teens 9–14, and 887,000 viewers among adults 18–49. The most watched episode of Jessie is "Star Wars" with 7.32 million viewers total and the least watched episode is "Basket Case" with 1.38 million viewers total.

Broadcast 
The series airs worldwide on Disney Channel. The series premiered on September 30, 2011, in Canada, on November 25, 2011, in Australia and New Zealand, and on December 17, 2011, in Singapore. It previewed on January 29, 2012, and premiered on February 17, 2012, in the United Kingdom and Ireland. It premiered on April 1, 2012 in South Africa. In Canada, the series premiered on Disney Channel on September 1, 2015, and was one of two series that Peyton List introduced along with Bunk'd.

Ratings 
 

| link2             = List of Jessie episodes#Season 2 (2012–13)
| episodes2         = 26
| start2            = 
| end2              = 
| startrating2      = 3.58
| endrating2        = 4.77
| viewers2          = |2}} 

| link3             = List of Jessie episodes#Season 3 (2013–14)
| episodes3         = 26
| start3            = 
| end3              = 
| startrating3      = 3.17
| endrating3        = 3.50
| viewers3          = |2}} 

| link4             = List of Jessie episodes#Season 4 (2015)
| episodes4         = 20
| start4            = 
| end4              = 
| startrating4      = 2.43
| endrating4        = 2.43
| viewers4          = |2}} 
}}

Awards and nominations

Soundtrack

Notes

References

External links 
 

2010s American children's comedy television series
2011 American television series debuts
2015 American television series endings
Television shows about child care occupations
Disney Channel original programming
English-language television shows
Television series by It's a Laugh Productions
Television shows set in New York City